Francis Aislabie (by 1515 – 1557), of South Dalton, Yorkshire, was an English politician.

Biography
He was the 1-st son of James Aislabie by Jane, daughter of Sir John Gower of Stittenham. He was married twice, the first one by 1536 to Maud, daughter of Ralph Gray of Barton, and had with her 4 sons and 4 daughters. His second wife was Joan. He had the following offices during his life: Forester, Galtres, Yorkshire from November 1545 to death; marshal, Haddington by August 1549; captain Dunglass by December 1549 – 1550; Justice of the Peace in Yorkshire (E. Riding) in 1554.

He was a relative of Sir Ralph Ellerker and with his name Aislabie was mentioned for the first time. He served under Ellerker as lieutenant of the light horse at Boulogne where, during December 1545, "where his bravery in the field earned him a commendation from the Earl of Surrey to the King."

Aislabie was a Member of Parliament for Scarborough in 1555.

References

1557 deaths
1515 births
Members of the Parliament of England for constituencies in Yorkshire
People from the East Riding of Yorkshire
English MPs 1555